Pareas is a genus of Asian snakes in the family Pareidae. All species in the genus Pareas are harmless to humans.

Species
Pareas contains the following species:
Pareas abros 
Pareas andersoniil  – Anderson's slug snake
Pareas atayal  – Atayal slug-eating snake
Pareas berdmorei  – Mengla snail-eating snake
Pareas boulengeri  – Boulenger's slug snake
Pareas carinatus  – keeled slug snake
Pareas chinensis  – Chinese slug snake
Pareas formosensis  – Formosa slug snake, Taiwan slug snake
Pareas geminatus  – twin slug snake
Pareas hamptoni  – Hampton's slug snake
Pareas iwasakii 
Pareas kaduri 
Pareas komaii  – Formosa slug snake
Pareas kuznetsovorum  
Pareas macularius  – mountain slug snake
Pareas margaritophorus  – mountain slug snake
Pareas menglaensis  – Mengla snail-eating snake
Pareas modestus 
Pareas monticola  – common slug snake
Pareas niger  – black snail-eating snake, Mengzi snail-eating snake
Pareas nigriceps  – Xiaoheishan slug-eater snake
Pareas nuchalis 
Pareas stanleyi  – Stanley's slug snake
Pareas temporalis 
Pareas victorianus  – Victoria slug snake
Pareas vindumi  – Vindum's slug eater
Pareas xuelinensis 

Nota bene: A binomial authority in parentheses indicates that the species was originally described in a genus other than Pareas.

References

 
Pareidae
Reptiles of Asia
Snake genera
Taxa named by Johann Georg Wagler
Taxonomy articles created by Polbot